The Statute Law Revision Act 1893 (56 & 57 Vict c 14) is an Act of the Parliament of the United Kingdom. Cotton said this Act is the twenty-second Statute Law Revision Act.

This Act was partly in force in Great Britain at the end of 2010.

This Act was retained for the Republic of Ireland by section 2(2)(a) of, and Part 4 of Schedule 1 to, the Statute Law Revision Act 2007.

Section 4(1) of Imperial Laws Application Act 1988 (No 112) provides that this Act is not part of the laws of New Zealand.

The enactments which were repealed (whether for the whole or any part of the United Kingdom) by this Act were repealed so far as they extended to the Isle of Man on 25 July 1991.

Section 3 of the Statute Law Revision Act 1898 provided that the second part of the Schedule to that Act was to be substituted for so much of this Act as related to the Record of Title Act (Ireland) 1865, and that this Act was to be read and construed as if the part so substituted had originally been enacted as part of this Act.

As to the construction of this Act, see Cairney v Wright (1908).

Bill
The Bill for this Act was called the Statute Law Revision (No. 1) Bill.

The Note and the third column of the Schedule to the Bill give the ground of repeal for each enactment proposed for repeal. Where the ground of repeal is implied repeal by an earlier statute, the details of the implied repeal are stated. The Note and the third column were struck out before the Bill passed, and are not included in the Act.

Section 1 - Enactments in Schedule repealed
The proviso to this section consists of the Westbury saving.

This section was repealed by Group 1 of Part IX of Schedule 1 to the Statute Law (Repeals) Act 1998.

Section 2 - Application of repealed enactments in local courts
The words "to the court of the county palatine of Lancaster or" in this section were repealed by section 56(4) of, and Part II of Schedule 11 to, the Courts Act 1971. This section was repealed by section 32(4) of, and Part V of Schedule 5 to, the Administration of Justice Act 1977.

Section 3 - Citation by short titles
This section provides that where any Act cites or refers to another Act otherwise than by its short title, the short title may, in any revised edition of the statutes printed by authority, be printed in substitution for such citation or reference.

Schedule
The Act contains, in the Schedule, repeals of 530 Acts or parts of Acts. The earliest Act dealt with is the Dublin Police Act 1837 (7 Will 4 & 1 Vict c 25). The latest Act dealt with is the Colonial Shipping Act 1868 (31 & 32 Vict c 129).

Territorial extent of Schedule
The Schedule repealed, as to all Her Majesty's Dominions, the whole of the Acts 25 & 26 Vict c 48 and 31 & 32 Vict c 57, and parts of the New Zealand Constitution Act 1852 (15 & 16 Vict c 72), the Act 27 & 28 Vict c 77, the Indian High Courts Act 1865 (28 & 29 Vict c 15), the India Military Funds Act 1866 (29 & 30 Vict c 18), the Act 29 & 30 Vict c 74, and the British North America Act 1867 (30 & 31 Vict c 3).

Amendments to Schedule
This Schedule was repealed by section 1 of, and the Schedule to, the Statute Law Revision Act 1908 (8 Edw 7 c 49). However, the proviso to section 1 of the Statute Law Revision Act 1908 provided that this Schedule was not repealed so far as this Schedule was in force in any part of His Majesty's dominions outside the United Kingdom.

Accordingly, the Statute Law Revision Act 1908 did not repeal, as to His Majesty's dominions outside the United Kingdom, much of this Schedule as related to the New Zealand Constitution Act 1852 (15 & 16 Vict c 72), the Act 25 & 26 Vict c 48, the Act 27 & 28 Vict c 77, the Indian High Courts Act 1865 (28 & 29 Vict c 15), the India Military Funds Act 1866 (29 & 30 Vict c 18), the Act 29 & 30 Vict c 74, the British North America Act 1867 (30 & 31 Vict c 3) and the Act 31 & 32 Vict c 57.

The effect of the Statute Law Revision Act 1908 is that the Schedule is repealed in the Republic of Ireland.

Section 15 of the Naval Discipline Act 1915 (5 & 6 Geo 5 c 30) provided that so much of the Schedule as related to the preamble to, and part of section 86 of, the Naval Discipline Act (29 & 30 Vict c 109) was to cease to have, and was to be deemed never to have had, effect.

Provisions of Schedule relating to Canada

This Schedule repealed, as to all Her Majesty's Dominions, sections 2, 25, 42 , 43, 81, 89, 127 and 145 of the British North America Act 1867. The Schedule also repealed, as to all Her Majesty's Dominions, the following portions the British North America Act 1867:
The words from "Be it therefore" to "same as follows";
Section 4 to "provisions", where it last occurred;
In section 51, the words from "of the census" to "seventy-one and" and the word "subsequent".
In Section 88, the words from "and the House" to the end.

The Bill for the Statute Law Revision Act 1893 says the ground of repeal was "As to Crown, see Interp. Act. Rest spent". The words "As to Crown, see Interp. Act." refer to section 30 of the Interpretation Act 1889. The provisions of this Schedule which relate to Canada consist of those which repeal parts of the British North America Act 1867. The provisions of this Schedule which repeal parts of the British North America Act 1867 were not repealed, as to His Majesty's dominions out of the United Kingdom, by the Statute Law Revision Act 1908.

In 1936, these repeals were not known to all Canadians; and in 1942, they were described as forgotten.

Landlord and Tenant Law Amendment Act, Ireland, 1860
As to the repeal of section 60 of Deasy's Act by the Statute Law Revision Act 1893, see Burton v Brady and Doyle v Paterson and McCarthy.

Public Houses Acts Amendment Act 1862
According to Edwin Adam, in Stirling v Dickson (1900), the Lord Justice General, and Lords Adam and M'Laren, sitting in the High Court of Justiciary, in a suspension, held that in view of the provisions of sections 3(2) and 6 of the Summary Procedure (Scotland) Act 1864 (27 & 28 Vict c 53), the repeal of section 18 of the Public Houses Acts Amendment Act 1862 (25 & 26 Vict c 35) by the Statute Law Revision Act 1893 did not make it necessary to revert to the six days induciae provided by section 23 of the Licensing (Scotland) Act 1828 (9 Geo 4 c 58), sometimes called the Home Drummond Act.

See also
Statute Law Revision Act
Statute Law Revision Act 1893 (Canada)

References and notes

Bibliography and further reading
Queen Victoria, 1893-4. Volume 30. 1894. Pages 33 to 110.
 
Halsbury's Statutes. Fourth Edition. 2008 Reissue. Volume 41. Page 704.
"The Statute Law Revision Act, 1893". Halsbury's Statutes of England. Second Edition. Butterworth & Co (Publishers) Ltd. Bell Yard, Temple Bar, London. 1950. Volume 24. Pages 237 and 238. See also pages 131, 186 to 188, 227, 242, 452, 453, 856, 858, 965, 975, 982, 985, 986 and 988.
"The Statute Law Revision Act, 1893". Halsbury's Statutes of England. (The Complete Statutes of England). First Edition. Butterworth & Co (Publishers) Ltd. Bell Yard, Temple Bar, London. 1930. Volume 18:  . Pages 1013 and 1014. See also pages 119, 127, 132 to 134 and 972 to 974.
Joseph Sutherland Cotton. "Statute Law Revision Act, 1893". The Practical Statutes of the Session 1893. Pages 37 to 80.
"The Statute Law Revision Act, 1893", N-W Provinces and Oudh Gazette, Part 1, 12 August 1893, pp 814 & 815.
(1899) 107 The Law Times 56 (20 May 1899)
(1893) 95 The Law Times 264 and 265 (22 July 1893)
(1893) 96 The Law Times 2 and 3 (4 November 1893)
(1893) 28 The Law Journal 104 (11 February 1893)
"Some Curiosities of Statute Law Revision" (1898) 32 Irish Law Times and Solicitors' Journal 120 (12 March 1898)
"The Legislation of the Past Session - I" (1894) 28 Irish Law Times and Solicitors' Journal 191 at 192 (14 April 1894)
"The Statute Law Revision Bill" (1893) 37 The Solicitors' Journal 301 (4 March 1893)
"Merchant Shipping" (1893) 37 The Solicitors' Journal 756 (16 September 1893)
"Statute Law Revision Act, 1893" (1893) 12 Law Notes 298 (October 1893)
"56 & 57 Vict c 14" (1893) 15 Law Students' Journal 196 (1 September 1893)
Wylie. Irish Landlord and Tenant Acts. 2015. pp 97, 103 & 122

External links
List of amendments and repeals in the Republic of Ireland from the Irish Statute Book.

United Kingdom Acts of Parliament 1893